This is a list of transfers in Serbian football for the 2013 summer transfer window.
Only moves featuring a Serbian SuperLiga side are listed.
The order by which the clubs are listed is equal to the classification of the SuperLiga at the end of the previous season, 2012–13.

Serbian SuperLiga

Partizan Belgrade

In:

Out:

Red Star Belgrade

In: 

	 
	 
	 
	 
	 
	 

Out:

Vojvodina

In:

Out:

Jagodina

In:

Out:

Sloboda Užice

In:

Out:

OFK Beograd

In:

Out:

Rad Beograd

In:

Out:

Spartak Subotica

In:

Out:

Javor Ivanjica

In:

Out:

Donji Srem

In:

Out:

Radnički Niš

In:

Out:

Radnički 1923

In:

Out:

Novi Pazar

In:

Out:

Napredak Kruševac

In:

Out:

Čukarički

In:

Out:

Voždovac

In:

Out:

See also
Serbian SuperLiga
2013–14 Serbian SuperLiga

References

External sources
 Sportske.net information agency.
 SuperLiga news at Sportski žurnal website.
 Sportal.rs information agency.
 Srpskifudbal.rs football website. Transfers page
 Superliga.rs

2013
Serbian SuperLiga
transfers